Miguel Ángel Alba (born August 11, 1988, in Mar del Plata, Buenos Aires) is an Argentine footballer who plays as a forward for Valletta in the Maltese Premier League.

External links
 
 

1988 births
Living people
Sportspeople from Mar del Plata
Argentine expatriate footballers
Argentine footballers
Alianza Petrolera players
Chacarita Juniors footballers
Club Atlético Douglas Haig players
Ñublense footballers
Club y Biblioteca Ramón Santamarina footballers
Pafos FC players
Valletta F.C. players
Gimnasia y Tiro footballers
Ermis Aradippou FC players
Birkirkara F.C. players
Veria F.C. players
Guaraní Antonio Franco footballers
Chilean Primera División players
Primera B de Chile players
Categoría Primera A players
Maltese Premier League players
Torneo Federal A players
Primera Nacional players
Cypriot First Division players
Expatriate footballers in Chile
Expatriate footballers in Colombia
Expatriate footballers in Cyprus
Expatriate footballers in Malta
Argentine expatriate sportspeople in Chile
Argentine expatriate sportspeople in Colombia
Argentine expatriate sportspeople in Cyprus
Argentine expatriate sportspeople in Malta
Association football forwards